Herbert Murray may refer to:

 Herbert Harley Murray (1829–1904), Scottish colonial governor
 Herbert Frazier Murray (1923–1999), United States federal judge
 Herbert Murray (footballer) (1886–1918), Scottish footballer
 Herbert Leith Murray (1880–1932), professor of obstetrics and gynaecology